Edward, Ed, or Ted Harrison may refer to:

Science and medicine
Edward Harrison (chemist) (1869–1918), British chemist
Edward Harrison (physician) (1766–1838), British physician
Edward Philip Harrison (1877–1948), British physicist and meteorologist
Edward Robert Harrison (1919–2007), British astronomer & cosmologist

Sports
Edward Harrison (cricketer) (1910–2002), English cricketer and squash player
Ed Harrison (American football) (1902–1981), American football player
Ed Harrison (baseball), American Negro leagues baseball player
Ed Harrison (footballer) (1884–1917), Australian rules footballer
Ed Harrison (ice hockey) (1927–2012), Canadian ice hockey player

Others
Edward Harrison (British administrator) (1674–1732), British administrator
Edward Harrison (Canadian politician), member of the Legislative Council of Lower Canada 
Edward Alfred Harrison (born 1869), American architect
Ted Harrison (1926–2015), Canadian painter
Edward Harrison (timpanist), Lyric Opera of Chicago principal